Peter Norvig (born December 14, 1956) is an American computer scientist and Distinguished Education Fellow at the Stanford Institute for Human-Centered AI. He previously served as a director of research and search quality at Google. Norvig is the co-author with Stuart J. Russell of the most popular textbook in the field of AI: Artificial Intelligence: A Modern Approach used in more than 1,500 universities in 135 countries.

Education
Norvig received a Bachelor of Science in applied mathematics from Brown University and a Ph.D. in computer science from the University of California, Berkeley.

Career and research
Norvig is a councilor of the Association for the Advancement of Artificial Intelligence and co-author, with Stuart J. Russell, of Artificial Intelligence: A Modern Approach, now the leading college text in the field. He was head of the Computational Sciences Division (now the Intelligent Systems Division) at NASA Ames Research Center, where he oversaw a staff of 200 scientists performing NASA's research and development in autonomy and robotics, automated software engineering and data analysis, neuroengineering, collaborative systems research, and simulation-based decision-making. Before that he was chief scientist at Junglee, where he helped develop one of the first Internet comparison-shopping services; chief designer at Harlequin Inc.; and senior scientist at Sun Microsystems Laboratories.

Norvig has served an assistant professor at the University of Southern California and a research faculty member at Berkeley. He has over fifty publications in various areas of computer science, concentrating on artificial intelligence, natural language processing, information retrieval and software engineering, including the books Artificial Intelligence: A Modern Approach, Paradigms of AI Programming: Case Studies in Common Lisp, Verbmobil: A Translation System for Face-to-Face Dialog, and Intelligent Help Systems for UNIX.

Norvig is one of the creators of JScheme. Norvig is listed under "Academic Faculty & Advisors" for the Singularity University. In 2011, Norvig worked with Sebastian Thrun to develop a popular online course in Artificial Intelligence that had more than 160,000 students enrolled. He also teaches an online course via the Udacity platform.

Selected publications and presentations
By 2022, Artificial Intelligence: A Modern Approach, which Norvig first co-authored with Stuart J. Russell in 1995, was the leading textbook in the field used by over 1400 schools globally.

In 2001, Norvig published a short article titled Teach Yourself Programming in Ten Years, arguing against the fashionable introductory programming textbooks that purported to teach programming in days or weeks.  The article was widely shared and discussed, and has attracted contributed translations to over 20 languages.

Norvig is also known for his 2003 Gettysburg Powerpoint Presentation, a satire about bad presentation practices using Abraham Lincoln's famous Gettysburg Address.

His 2009 IEEE Intelligent Systems article, "The Unreasonable Effectiveness of Data" co-authored with Alon Y. Halevy and  Fernando Pereira, described how the best approach to highly complex natural language understanding problems is to harness large quantities of data, not to depend on "tidy", simple formulas. They said that by generating "large amounts of unlabeled, noisy data, new algorithms can be used to build high-quality models from the data. This has informed the development of foundation models. "But invariably, simple models and a lot of data trump more elaborate models based on less data." "Choose a representation that can use unsupervised learning on unlabeled data, which is so much more plentiful than labeled data." The title refers to the physicist Eugene Wigner's 1960 journal article, "The Unreasonable Effectiveness of Mathematics in the Natural Sciences". 

In a 23 September 2010 lecture presented as part of the Vancouver-based University of British Columbia's Department of Computer Science's Distinguished Lecture Series, Norvig, who was then the Director of Research at Google, described how large quantities of data deepen our understanding of phenomena.

In his June 2012 Ted Talk, described the fall of 2011 hybrid class on artificial intelligence attended by 100,000 online students around the globe that he co-taught with Sebastian Thrun at Stanford University.

Awards and honors
Norvig was elected an AAAI Fellow in 2001 and a fellow of the Association for Computing Machinery in 2006.

References

External links
 The Prospects for AI, featuring Neil Jacobstein, Patrick Lincoln, Peter Norvig, and Bruno Olshausen
 An experiment by Norvig on Scientific opinion on climate change

Artificial intelligence researchers
Google employees
American computer scientists
Fellows of the Association for Computing Machinery
Fellows of the Association for the Advancement of Artificial Intelligence
Lisp (programming language) people
Python (programming language) people
Living people
1956 births
Brown University alumni
University of California, Berkeley alumni
Natural language processing researchers